The Tantra of Kalachakra is the basis of Tibetan astronomy. It explains some phenomena in a similar manner as modern astronomy science. Hence, Sun eclipse is described as the Moon passing between the Sun and the Earth.  

In 1318, the 3rd Karmapa received vision of Kalachakra which he used to introduce a revised system of astronomy and astrology named the "Tsurphu Tradition of Astrology" (Tibetan: Tsur-tsi) which is still used in the Karma Kagyu school for the calculation of the Tibetan calendar.

References

Further reading
 Alexander Berzin Tibetan Astrology and Astronomy. in Maitreya Magazine (Emst, Holland), vol. 11, no. 4 (1989).
 Berzin, A  Tibetan Astro Studies. in Chö-Yang, Year of Tibet Edition (Dharamsala, India), (1991).

 
Ancient astronomy